Jesper Thomsen (born 21 October 1974) is a Danish badminton player.

Career 
In 2001, Jesper Thomsen won the Slovak Internationals and the Scottish Open. In 2004, he won at the Czech Internationals and the Austrian Internationals. In the same year, he won two medals at the Badminton World Federation Senior European Championships.

Victories

External links 
Jesper Thomsen  on the Badminton World Federation Website

1974 births
Danish male badminton players
Living people